Strawbs is the first album released by the English band Strawbs. The Sandy Denny & The Strawbs LP All Our Own Work was recorded earlier, but not released until 1973.

Not initially issued in the US, US A&M did issue two singles ("Oh How She's Changed" b/w "Or Am I Dreaming", and "The Man Who Called Himself Jesus" b/w "Poor Jimmy Wilson").

Legacy

Track listing
All tracks written by Dave Cousins, except where noted.

These tracks were recorded on January 12, 1969 for John Peel's "Top Gear" radio show on BBC Radio 1.

Personnel
Strawbs
Dave Cousins – guitars, lead and backing vocals
Tony Hooper – guitars, lead and backing vocals
Ron Chesterman – double bass

Additional personnel
John Paul Jones – bass guitar
Nicky Hopkins – piano
Richard Wilson – spoken words
Norati and his Arab Friends - Arab string section on "Tell Me What You See in Me".

Recording
Gus Dudgeon – producer and engineer
Tony Visconti - arranger
Tom Wilkes - art direction
Barry Feinstein, Ray Stevenson - photography

Release history

References

Sleeve notes 5302679 Strawbs

Strawbs albums
1969 debut albums
Albums produced by Gus Dudgeon
A&M Records albums